"Walter Lesly" is Child ballad 296.

Synopsis

Walter Lesly asks a lady to come to Conland.  Then his kinsmen, led by Geordy Lesly, carry her off.  A wedding feast is ready, and they are put in bed together.  When he is asleep, she gets up, dresses, and runs off, swearing to deal no more with him.

It concludes with the observation that he was not interested in either her looks or her noble blood, but only her money.

Origins
The ballad had previously been published in Peter Buchan's Ancient Ballads and Songs of the North of Scotland (published in 1828).

See also
List of the Child Ballads
Broughty Wa's

References

Child Ballads
Year of song unknown
Songwriter unknown